The Nissan Present the 38th Annual 12 Hours of Sebring International Grand Prix of Endurance, was the third round of both the 1990 IMSA GT Championship season and was held at the Sebring International Raceway, on 17 March 1990.

Results

Class Winners are in Bold text.

 Pole position: Derek Daly/Chip Robinson/Geoff Brabham, 1:55.767

Class Winners

References

IMSA GTP
12 Hours of Sebring
12 Hours of Sebring
Sebring
12 Hours of Sebring